SmartCity may refer to:

 SmartCity Malta
 SmartCity, Kochi
 Smart city, an urban development vision